Heselton is a surname. Notable people with the surname include one of the following individuals:

Bernard Heselton (1903–1981), American football coach in the United States
Francis Heselton Helme (1899–1984), Liberal party member of the Canadian House of Commons
John W. Heselton (1900–1962), Republican member of the United States House of Representatives
Philip Heselton (born 1946), retired British Conservation Officer and Wiccan initiate

See also
Doehling-Heselton Memorial Trophy, football trophy awarded annually
Haseltonia
Heseltine
Jesselton

English-language surnames